Jennie Kim (born January 16, 1996), known mononymously as Jennie, is a South Korean singer and rapper. Born and raised in South Korea, Jennie studied in New Zealand for five years before returning to South Korea in 2010. She debuted as a member of the girl group Blackpink, formed by YG Entertainment, in August 2016. In November 2018, Jennie made her debut as a solo artist with the single "Solo". The song was commercially successful, topping both the Gaon Digital Chart and Billboards World Digital Songs chart. In 2023, she will be making her acting debut in the HBO series The Idol, under the stage name Jennie Ruby Jane.

Early life
Jennie Kim was born in Cheongdam-dong, Gangnam-gu, Seoul on January 16, 1996, as an only child. She initially attended Cheongdam Elementary School in Seoul before moving to New Zealand. When she was eight years old, she went on a trip with her family to Australia and New Zealand. When her mother asked her if she liked New Zealand and wanted to stay, Jennie replied "yes"; one year later, she was sent to study at Waikowhai Intermediate School in Auckland and lived with a home-stay family. Jennie spoke about her experience learning a new language on the MBC's documentary English, Must Change to Survive (2006). During her adolescent years, she dreamed of becoming a ballet dancer. After completing intermediate, she enrolled at ACG Parnell College.

Jennie first heard of K-pop while in New Zealand, particularly finding an interest in YG Entertainment's music. Her mother planned to move her to Florida in the United States at the age of 14 to continue her studies to become a lawyer or teacher; however, she did not like the idea and was concerned about not finding work she liked while living alone. Her family supported her decision, and she moved back to South Korea in 2010, where she studied at Cheongdam Middle School. Jennie auditioned for YG Entertainment that same year with Rihanna's "Take a Bow", succeeding in joining the label as a trainee. Through High Cut Korea, she revealed because she was afraid of strangers and reluctant to take initiative, she could barely introduce herself during her audition. Initially a vocalist, the company believed she should embrace the role of a rapper as most songs she covered included raps and she was the only trainee fluent in English at the time, along with her native Korean; she also knows basic Japanese and has learned French.

Career

2012–2017: Career beginnings and debut with Blackpink 

On April 10, 2012, Jennie was introduced through a photo titled "Who's that girl?" via the official blog of YG Entertainment. Her photograph gained interest from netizens, soon becoming the most searched topic on portal sites under the name "Mystery Girl". On August 30, YG Entertainment released a YouTube video through their blog titled "YG Trainee - Jennie Kim", in which she covered B.o.B.'s song "Strange Clouds" featuring Lil Wayne. On September 1, Jennie made her first public appearance as the lead actress in G-Dragon's music video "That XX" from his extended play One of a Kind. On January 21, 2013, another video titled "Jennie Kim - YG New Artist", in which she covered the song "Lotus Flower Bomb" by rapper Wale, was released. In March, Lee Hi featured Jennie on her B-side track, "Special" from her debut album, First Love. In August, Jennie featured on Seungri's B-side track "GG Be" from his extended play Let's Talk About Love. In September, she featured on G-Dragon's B-side track "Black", recording the hook in less than five days before the release of his album Coup d'Etat. On September 8, she made her first stage appearance alongside G-Dragon on SBS' Inkigayo.

On June 1, 2016, Jennie was the first member to be revealed for YG Entertainment's newest girl group, its first in seven years since 2NE1. On August 8, 2016, she debuted as a member of Blackpink, alongside Kim Jisoo, Roseanne Park and Lalisa Manobal, with the release of their single album Square One alongside double A-side singles "Boombayah" (붐바야) and "Whistle" (휘파람). According to band-mate Jisoo, Jennie was responsible for the general duties and decision making of the group. Jennie recounted her six-year experience as a trainee through V Live, stating each month a group, dance, and solo song were performed for the label's CEO, producers and artists to watch and evaluate the progress of their training. She also recalled memories preparing outfits and songs, making musical accompaniments, and practicing choreography.

2018–present: Rising popularity, solo debut and acting debut 

Jennie appeared with Blackpink member Jisoo on Running Man in July 2018. A video of Jennie crying after going through a horror room with Lee Kwang-soo went viral in South Korea, gaining over one million views on one site and a total of over three million views across multiple platforms, VODs, and social media. She was subsequently selected as one of the best variety stars of 2018 following her discovery on Running Man. Jennie was invited to the show again after attracting attention during her previous appearance. Jennie was said to have ranked first among casting choices and received multiple offers from different variety shows. On October 1, Jennie was confirmed to join as a cast member for SBS' new variety show Village Survival, the Eight, her first permanent casting in a television series.

In mid-October 2018, an announcement of Jennie's official solo debut was made. Following a series of promotional teasers, it was revealed she would release a single album titled Solo with a lead single of the same name. In the midst of preparation for her debut, it was decided that her single "Solo" would first be revealed through Blackpink's In Your Area tour in Seoul on November 10, ahead of release two days later. Jennie explained how "Solo" became the song for her debut through her press conference on November 12, stating, "When I'm at Teddy's studio, he'll make a song and I'll just record the guide for it. It wasn't that he was working on a solo track for me. He just said, 'I have something new, let's try it.' So I recorded the song he had, and it happened to be a great fit". The song was described as a hip hop track with pop elements and was designed to showcase Jennie's sides as both a "delicate girl" and "independent woman".

Upon release, "Solo" debuted on Gaon Music Chart at number one and achieved a triple crown for simultaneously topping the domestic digital, download, and streaming charts. The single remained the on the digital and mobile charts for two further consecutive weeks and on the streaming chart for a further three consecutive weeks. "Solo" was certified platinum for streaming by the KMCA and soon won the Song of the Year award for the month of November at the eighth Gaon Chart Music Awards, as well as the Digital Bonsang award at the 34th Golden Disc Awards. Overseas, "Solo" topped the Billboard'''s World Digital Songs chart. It was also featured in the New York Times' playlist. At the time of release, the music video for "Solo" became the most viewed by a female Korean solo artist of all time within a 24 hour period on YouTube. Jennie also became the first and only female Korean solo artist to surpass 300 million views on the platform within six months of release. Because her first appearance as a solo artist on SBS' Inkigayo and MBC Show! Music Core was postponed as broadcasters had cancelled all the performances scheduled for that week, YG Entertainment uploaded choreography videos for the song on YouTube for fans. YG Entertainment then aired the Jennie – 'Solo' Diary series on YouTube, sharing glimpses of her work throughout the promotion period of the single. On November 25, Jennie received her first music show win as a solo artist on Inkigayo.

In April 2019, Jennie became the first Korean solo artist to perform at Coachella. Her performance was included in "The 10 Best Things We Saw at Coachella 2019" list by Billboard, which called it "mind-blowing" and "stunning" for fans and casual passersby.

Jennie co-wrote the song "Lovesick Girls" for Blackpink, which was released on October 2, 2020 as the third single from the group's debut studio album, The Album. During Blackpink's Born Pink World Tour starting in October 2022, she debuted a new solo song titled "You & Me".

In 2022, it was announced Jennie would be making her acting debut under the stage name Jennie Ruby Jane in the HBO television series The Idol, which was created by The Weeknd, Reza Fahim, and Sam Levinson.

 Artistry and image 

 Influences and musical style 
When Jennie first began to rap, she studied the work of artists she admired and respected, such as Lauryn Hill and TLC. Jennie cited Rihanna as her main musical influence and role model. While working on Blackpink's The Album, Jennie listened to artists such as Lana Del Rey, Billie Eilish, Harry Hudson, H.E.R. and Kacey Musgraves. Vocal coach Shin Yoo-mi, who worked with Blackpink for six years until their debut, trained Jennie for her solo debut. In an interview, Shin described Jennie as a multi-player had talent for singing, rapping, and writing lyrics.

 Fashion and image 
Jennie began reading fashion magazines and looking at different clothing styles when she was a child. Her interest in fashion came from her mother. Jennie told Elle Indonesia that Chanel was a part of her life from a young age and that she still remembered her first memory involving the fashion house: "I remember when I was little, I look through my mother's wardrobe, and search for whatever vintage Chanel I could find". For her solo debut, she was involved in planning and styling her own wardrobe and put together more than 20 outfits for the music video of "Solo". Jennie recalled in an interview with Billboard that during the music video filming, she considered the way each would fit the song and what she could change, which helped her to learn many new ways of approaching fashion. She stated in an interview with Elle Korea that fashion became an important aspect in her career as she tried to convey the message of her music both aurally and visually.

Although Jennie has been noted for her chic and strong image on stage, her off-stage personality is characterized by a cute reversal charm. She describes herself as "quiet" and "shy", especially around strangers. In an interview with Harper's Bazaar, Jennie remarked, "My personality may be what people think about my personality. But rather than being a person that other people have branded me as, I want to be a good individual who thinks for herself". Jung Chul-min, producer of Village Survival, the Eight, described Jennie as "really funny": "Contrary to the charisma she shows on stage, she is a shy person who has girlish, baby-like charms. Jennie gets more comfortable with each episode, she brings out more fun and enjoys it even more". When asked by Elle Korea about being described as "icon" and "unique", Jennie responded that "it's really an honor to be an inspiration and iconic being for someone. When you express me with these words, I feel like [I need] to look nicer and better".

 Impact and influence 

Jennie, instrumental in Blackpink's fashion image, has been nicknamed "Human Gucci" and "Human Chanel". Her style portfolio ranges from Gucci and Saint Laurent to niche labels such as Marine Serre and Richard Quinn. Jennie's sense of fashion earned her invitations to fashion events such as Saint Laurent's Summer 17 Collection Launch Party by Anthony Vaccarello, Chanel's Mademoiselle Privé exhibition, and Prada's Comics Collection Launch Party. Chanel chose her as House Ambassador after noting her ripple commercial impact. The hairpins Jennie wore in a five-by-five partition during her performances of her debut single "Solo" instantly trended in South Korea and were referred to as "Jennie's hairpins".

Jennie's first magazine cover and a solo pictorial were for Dazed Korea with Saint Laurent in April 2017. She was the first Korean celebrity to model for Boucheron Paris, a 160-year-old luxury jewellery brand; it was said that Jennie's "elegant" and "luxurious" atmosphere moved Boucheron to focus more on their image marketing. The pictorial, presented in the high-end membership magazine Heren in 2017, was described as "art that embodies light". Jennie has since appeared on the covers of numerous fashion magazines, including Dazed, Harper's Bazaar, Elle, Marie Claire, High Cut, Cosmopolitan, W, Vogue, Wonderland, and Billboard.

Jennie is known for her brand recognition and marketing power, having placed first on the Korean Business Research Institute's monthly "Individual Girl Group Members Brand Power Ranking" numerous times. Photos from her social media accounts headline articles, and the items she features become trends. In 2018, Jennie ranked second, receiving 12.2% of votes, in the Most Favorite Idols survey conducted annually by Gallup Korea that involved 1,501 Korean male and female respondents aged 13 to 29. Instagram named Jennie's account the "Most Loved Account of 2018" in South Korea based on the number of views and likes received by her Instagram stories and posts that year.Forbes acknowledged that Jennie has been "gaining a new foothold in Korea's beauty trends" and cited it as one of the reasons why Blackpink topped Forbes Korea Power Celebrity in April 2019. She was the most-searched female K-pop idol of 2019 according to Google's mid-year chart. That year, Jennie was also ranked as the seventh most popular female K-pop idol in a survey of soldiers completing mandatory military service in South Korea. In Gallup Korea's music poll in 2019, Jennie was voted the eighth most popular idol in South Korea, ahead of her bandmates. Jennie's "Jentle Home" collection, launched in April 2020, sold out immediately on multiple occasions the collection's products being restocked. On December 2, 2020, Chinese singer and former Youth With You contestant Ye Ziming released a song titled "Jennie", which featured lyrics about his admiration of Jennie.

On January 16, 2021, her 25th birthday, Jennie started her official YouTube channel. It gained one million subscribers in less than seven hours, becoming the fastest channel to do so on the platform. Within 24 hours, she accumulated over 1.75 million subscribers and became the second most subscribed YouTube user within the timeframe, following Brazilian singer Marília Mendonça. Sales losses suffered by Chum Churum, a soju brand under Lotte Corporation, due to the impacts of the COVID-19 pandemic were reported to have recovered by 14–15% after they secured Jennie to promote their product. It was also reported that Ace Bed stock price soaring 28.14% after naming Jennie as their new brand model. Former K-pop girl group After School member Jung Ah nicknamed her baby Jennie, calling it a "cute and pretty" name and citing her admiration of Jennie as an idol. In August 2021, Jennie was voted the sixth most well-rounded idol with talents in songwriting, dancing, and singing. She was the highest rank female idol on the list with 2,025 votes. Jennie became the first Korean individual to amass 50 million followers on Instagram. In November 2021, Osen reported that Jennie was ranked sixth in celebrity endorsement earnings in 2021, with an estimated ₩5 billion, despite only appearing in five advertisements that year.

On February 23, 2022, a day after the release of her Jentle Garden app, it was reported that it had ranked number one in the "popularity" category of the Korean App Store, surpassing social media platform TikTok. In March 2022, YG Family's video titled 'Fifteen Nights on a Business Trip 2' with Jennie as a special guest has surpassed 10 million views on YouTube. The clothes she wore went viral, including search phrases on portal sites.

Various artists have cited Jennie as an influence and role model, such as Hot Issue's Dana, Woo!ah!'s Nana, Cignature's Belle, LinQ's Miyu Kaneko, Nmixx's Lily, Sullyoon and Jiwoo, Aespa's Ningning, Lightsum's Jian and Limelight's Gaeun. Olympic athletes Hwang Sun-woo and Kang So-hwi are also fans of Jennie.

 Other ventures 
 Endorsements 
In 2019, Jennie became the face of Hera, a South Korean luxury beauty brand owned by Amore Pacific, choosing Jennie to represent their brand due to her "elegant and luxurious" image. Hera's first lip advertisement with Jennie, the Red Vibe lip series, saw an increase in sales by five times compared to Hera's previous lip product. Due to their growing popularity, they were dubbed "Jennie's lipsticks". In April 2021, Hera launched their Rouge Holic line on Amazon with Jennie serving as their global ambassador. In April 2022, Jennie promoted Hera's Silky Stay Foundation.

KT Corporation, South Korea's largest telephone company, recruited Jennie as an endorsement model alongside Soojoo for the Samsung Galaxy S20 Aura Red and Blue, respectively, in February 2020. The product, named "Jennie Red", was launched exclusively for KT customers residing in South Korea. On June 11, 2020 Lotte Confectionery announced Jennie as their brand endorser for their latest snack product, Air Baked. They considered Jennie to be "trendy" within their targeted customer demographic, women in their 20s and 30s, for the product.

On February 2, 2021, Jennie was announced as the face of Chum Churum, a soju brand under Lotte Corporation. On February 10, Lotte Chilsung released Jennie's promotional material for the brand for the first time. On March 8, Jennie became the advertisement model of Kwangdong Vita500, a vitamin drink brand. On April 8, Dashing Diva, a global nail brand, introduced Jennie as their new brand model. On August 17, she became a model for South Korean bed and mattress brand Ace Bed. In August 2022, Jennie became the face of soju brand Lotte Soonhari. In September 2022, Jennie became a model for South Korean perfume brand Tamburins.

 Fashion 
Jennie was chosen as the new muse for Chanel Korea Beauty and shot her first pictorial for the brand with Harper's Bazaar Korea in January 2018. She became the ambassador of Chanel Korea in June. A spokesperson for Chanel Korea explained that Jennie's loyalty to the brand, as well as her trendy style, was in line with Chanel's image as they targeted young millennials in addition to their current consumers. Jennie attended the launch of Chanel's new fragrance, Les Eaux De Chanel, in Deauville, France, that same month. She met and interviewed Chanel's in-house perfume creator, Olivier Polge, and shot a pictorial for his new collection of fragrances with Cosmopolitan Korea. In October, Jennie was named global ambassador for Chanel. She attended her first Chanel fashion show as a Korean representative during Paris Fashion Week, sitting front-row next to Pharrell Williams and Pamela Anderson. On September 23, 2021, Jennie became the face of Chanel's Coco Neige 2021-22 campaign with photos taken by Dutch photographers Inez and Vinoodh.

On May 18, 2021, Jennie became the face of Calvin Klein's Spring 2021 collection, Drop 02, a collaboration between Calvin Klein and Heron Preston. Her campaign images were shot by photographer Kim Hee June and directed by Qiu Bohan. On September 9, 2021, Jennie became a model for Calvin Klein's Fall 2021 campaign, called The Language of Calvin Klein, as part of the brand's #MyCalvins digital campaign. Her photos were shot by Hong Jang Hyun. On February 16, 2022, Jennie became the face of Calvin Klein's Spring 2022 Campaign.

Jennie served as one of the fashion editors for Vogue Korea's March 2021 issue. According to the magazine, she participated in photoshoots as a planner and helped decide the concept, hair and makeup drafts, and styling.

 Collaborations 
On April 15, 2020, it was announced that Jennie had collaborated with Gentle Monster, a South Korean luxury eyewear brand, to create a collection called "Jentle Home", inspired by Jennie's childhood memories. Jennie designed the items herself, including glasses, sunglasses, eyewear chains, and more. In May 2020, Gentle Monster and Jennie opened a dollhouse-themed pop up store  in Gangnam-gu, Seoul. On February 18, 2022, Gentle Monster announced the launch of the mobile game Jentle Garden, their second collaboration with Jennie, which released on February 22 in the Google Play Store and App Store. The game was launched to commemorate the next product collaboration, scheduled to be launched in mid-March. On March 10, 2022, Jennie and Gentle Monster released their third collaboration, an eyewear collection called "Jentle Garden". The campaign photos were shot by French photographer Hugo Comte. Days later, Jennie and Gentle Monster opened a fantasy world-themed pop up store in Gangnam-gu, Seoul. The house at the pop up store was designed by Jennie. In April 2022, Jennie and Gentle Monster released a limited eyewear collection titled Lesyeuxdenini which were only available at Gentle Monster's Los Angeles flagship store. Jennie also designed the collection's leather package and flower keyring. On October 12, 2022, it was announced that Jennie had begun a partnership with German auto company Porsche, and helped in the design process of a custom car made for herself, named Jennie Ruby Jane'' in the model of a Taycan 4S Cross Turismo.

Philanthropy 
Jennie has been part of the Cheongdam Woori Animal Hospital's "Protect Our Family" campaign since 2018, which helps to protect pets and rescue abandoned dogs.

Discography

Single albums

Singles

Songwriting credits 
All song credits are adapted from the Korea Music Copyright Association's database, unless otherwise noted.

Videography

Music videos

Filmography

Television series

Web shows

Music video appearances

Awards and nominations

Notes

References

External links 

 
 

1996 births
Living people
Singers from Seoul
Models from Seoul
South Korean women pop singers
South Korean women rappers
South Korean dance musicians
South Korean female idols
21st-century South Korean women singers
Interscope Records artists
K-pop singers
Japanese-language singers of South Korea
English-language singers from South Korea
South Korean expatriates in New Zealand
Blackpink members
YG Entertainment artists
South Korean television personalities
Dance-pop musicians